Stein Mountain, elev. 2761 m (9058 feet), is a mountain in the Lillooet Ranges of southwestern British Columbia, Canada, located northwest of the confluence of the Stein and Fraser Rivers, which is just upstream from the town of Lytton.  Its name derives from that of the Stein River.

References

Two-thousanders of British Columbia
Fraser Canyon
Lillooet Ranges